Mortal means susceptible to death; the opposite of immortal. 

Mortal may also refer to:

 Mortal (band), a Christian industrial band
 The Mortal, Sakurai Atsushi's project band
 Mortal (novel), a science fiction fantasy novel by Ted Dekker and Tosca Lee
 Mortals (novel), a 2003 novel by Norman Rush
 Mortal (film), a 2020 adventure film
 "Mortal" (Smallville), an episode of the television series Smallville

See also
 Mortal Kombat, a fighting game series
 Mortal Online, a 2010 video game by Star Vault
 Mortality (disambiguation)